Park City Hospital (formerly Park City Medical Center) is a full-service community hospital in Park City, Utah, United States. It is located at 900 Round Valley Drive at the northwest corner of Keetley Junction US-40/US-189 and SR-248 (Kearns Boulevard). It a service of Intermountain Healthcare, a nonprofit health care system serving the Intermountain West.

Park City Medical Center opened 15 September 2009.

See also
 
 List of hospitals in Utah

References

External links
 
 
 USNews Health Hospitals

Intermountain Health
Hospital buildings completed in 2009
Hospitals in Utah
2009 establishments in Utah